The 1917 Miami Redskins football team was an American football team that represented Miami University as a member of the Ohio Athletic Conference (OAC) during the 1917 college football season. In its first season under head coach George Rider, Miami compiled a 6–0–2 record (5–0–1 against conference opponents), held every opponent scoreless, and won the OAC championship.  

The season was part of a 27-game unbeaten streak that began in November 1915 and ended in October 1919.

Schedule

References

Miami
Miami RedHawks football seasons
Miami Redskins football